Rupert Burke Andrews, Jr. (October 23, 1926 – January 15, 2008) was a Canadian football player who played for the Edmonton Eskimos and Calgary Stampeders. He won the Grey Cup with the Eskimos in 1955. Andrews was born in San Diego, California and played football while he attended Stanford University.

References

1926 births
2008 deaths
Calgary Stampeders players
Edmonton Elks players
Stanford Cardinal football players
Players of Canadian football from San Diego
Players of American football from San Diego